African Elephants is the second studio album by American punk rock band Dead to Me. It was released through Fat Wreck Chords on November 10, 2009.

Track listing
All songs fought for by Dead to Me. All lyrics by Chicken and Nathan.

 "X" – 2:45
 "Modern Muse" – 2:43
 "Nuthin Runnin Through My Brain" – 1:29
 "A Day Without a War" – 2:29
 "Bad Friends" – 3:21
 "Liebe Liese" – 2:01
 "Cruel World" – 2:43
 "Three Chord Strut" – 2:51
 "California Sun" – 3:39
 "Fell Right In" – 3:03
 "I Dare You" – 2:01
 "Tierra del Fuego" – 2:45
 "Blue" – 2:43

Personnel
Personnel for African Elephants, according to album liner notes.

Dead to Me
Tyson "Chicken" Annicharico – Bass, Vocals
Nathan Grice – Guitar, Vocals
Ian Anderson – Drums, Background Vocals

Production Credits
Jamie McMann – Produced, Engineered and Mixed at Motor Studios
Mastered by Tardon at Mr. Toad's
Ian and Brian Archer – Layout and artwork (photo by Brian Archer)

References

2009 albums
Dead to Me albums
Fat Wreck Chords albums